Theodore D. Day (April 20, 1917 – December 22, 2003) was an American farmer and politician from New York.

Day was born in New York City. He attended Phillips Academy and graduated from Yale University in 1940. Day ran a dairy farm in Interlaken, Seneca County, New York. He married Frances MacPherson, and they had three children. Day was an avid fisherman and outdoorsman.

Day was a member of the New York State Assembly (Seneca County) from 1961 to 1965, sitting in the 173rd, 174th, and 175th New York State Legislatures.

Day was a member of the New York State Senate from 1966 to 1972, sitting in the 176th, 177th, 178th, and 179th New York State Legislatures. In 1972, he was appointed assistant commissioner of the New York State Department of Agriculture and Markets.

Day died at Cayuga Medical Center in Ithaca, New York.

Sources

1917 births
Phillips Academy alumni
Yale University alumni
People from Seneca County, New York
Farmers from New York (state)
20th-century American politicians
Republican Party members of the New York State Assembly
Republican Party New York (state) state senators
2003 deaths